The 2022 Ohio Attorney General election took place on November 8, 2022, to elect the Attorney General of the state of Ohio. David Yost was re-elected to a second term in a landslide, defeating Democratic opponent Jeffrey Crossman by a comfortable 20 percentage points. The election coincided with various other federal and state elections, including for Governor of Ohio.

Republican primary

Candidates

Declared
 Dave Yost, incumbent attorney general

Endorsements

Results

Democratic primary

Candidates

Declared
 Jeffrey Crossman, state representative from the 15th district

Endorsements

Results

General election

Predictions

Endorsements

Polling 
Graphical summary

Results

References

External links
Official campaign websites
 Jeff Crossman (D) for Attorney General
 Dave Yost (R) for Attorney General

Attorney General
Ohio
Ohio Attorney General elections